Sir Hill Godfrey Morgan,   (20 June 1862 – 4 January 1923) was a British Army officer.

After serving in the militia, he joined the regular army as part of 1st Battalion Gloucestershire Regiment in 1883, five years later transferring to the Army Service Corps as a Captain. For service in the Dongola Expeditionary Force of 1896–1898 he was mentioned in despatches, awarded the Order of Medjidie and made a Companion of the Distinguished Service Order (DSO). He also received the Order of Osmania and was again mentioned in despatches, both for his participation in the Nile Expedition and Relief of Khartoum.

He arrived in South Africa after the outbreak of the Second Boer War in late 1899 as Director of Supplies, serving in the 1899 operations in Natal, at the Relief of Ladysmith and in the battles of Colenso, Vaal Kranz, Tugela Heights, Pieters Hill, Laing’s Nek and Belfast. For his service he received a further four mentions in despatches, was promoted to the brevet rank of lieutenant-colonel on 29 November 1900, and was created a Companion of the Order of the Bath (CB) in the October 1902 South Africa Honours list. While in South Africa, he had three of his horses riding to victory in the inaugural meeting at Pretoria's new racecourse After the end of the war in June 1902, Morgan stayed in South Africa for several months, returning home on the SS Scot in November. In 1905 he was promoted to the substantial rank of lieutenant-colonel.

In 1906 he retired with the brevet rank of Colonel, but was recalled to service in August 1914 as Assistant Director of Supplies, Central Force. In January 1915 he was made Administrative Member, Forage Committee, effectively making him the commander of the Women's Forage Corps. By the war's end he had risen to his final rank of Brigadier-General and gained the CMG, KBE and one further mention in despatches.

References

British Army generals
1862 births
1923 deaths
Knights Commander of the Order of the British Empire
Companions of the Distinguished Service Order
Companions of the Order of St Michael and St George
British Army personnel of the Second Boer War
Gloucestershire Regiment officers
Royal Army Service Corps officers
British Army personnel of the Mahdist War
British Army personnel of World War I